Floating Point Systems, Inc. (FPS), was a Beaverton, Oregon vendor of attached array processors and minisupercomputers. The company was founded in 1970 by former Tektronix engineer Norm Winningstad, with partners Tom Prince, Frank Bouton and Robert Carter.  Carter was a salesman for Data General Corp. who persuaded Bouton and Prince to leave Tektronix to start the new company.  Winningstad was the fourth partner.

History
The original goal of the company was to supply economical, but high-performance, floating point coprocessors for minicomputers.  In 1976, the AP-120B array processor was produced.  This was soon followed by a unit for larger systems and IBM mainframes, the FPS AP-190. In 1981, the follow-on FPS-164 was produced, followed by the FPS-264, which had the same architecture.  This was five times faster, using ECL instead of TTL chips.

These processors were widely used as attached processors for scientific applications in reflection seismology, physical chemistry, NSA cryptology and other disciplines requiring large numbers of computations.  Attached array processors were usually used in facilities where larger supercomputers were either not needed or not affordable. Hundreds if not thousands of FPS boxes were delivered and highly regarded. FPS's primary competition up to this time was IBM (3838 array processor) and CSP Inc.

Cornell University, led by physicist Kenneth G. Wilson, made a supercomputer proposal to NSF with IBM to produce a processor array of FPS boxes attached to an IBM mainframe with the name lCAP.

Parallel processing 
In 1986, the T-Series hypercube computers using INMOS transputers and Weitek floating-point processors was introduced. The T stood for "Tesseract". Unfortunately, parallel processing was still in its infancy and the software tools and libraries for the T-Series didn't facilitate customers' parallel programming.  I/O was also difficult, so the T-Series was discontinued, a mistake costing tens of millions of dollars that was nearly fatal to FPS. A few dozen T-series were delivered.

Celerity acquisition; acquisition by Cray 
In 1988, FPS acquired the assets of Celerity Computing of San Diego, California, renaming itself as FPS Computing. Celerity's product lines were further developed by FPS, the Celerity 6000 minisupercomputer being developed into the FPS Model 500 series.

FPS was acquired by Cray in 1991 for $3.25 million, and their products became the S-MP and APP product lines of Cray Research.

The S-MP was a SPARC-based multiprocessor server (based on the Model 500); the MCP a matrix co-processor array based on eighty-four Intel i860 processors. After Cray purchased FPS, it changed the group's direction by making them Cray Research Superservers, Inc., later becoming the Cray Business Systems Division (Cray BSD). The MCP was renamed the Cray APP. The S-MP architecture was not developed further. Instead, it was replaced by the Cray Superserver 6400, (CS6400), which was derived indirectly from a collaboration between Sun Microsystems and Xerox PARC.

Acquisition by SGI and Sun 
Silicon Graphics acquired Cray Research in 1996, and shortly afterward the Cray BSD business unit along with the CS6400 product line was sold to Sun Microsystems for an undisclosed amount (acknowledged later by a Sun executive to be "significantly less than $100 million"). Sun was then able to bring to market the follow-on to the CS6400 which Cray BSD was developing at the time, codenamed Starfire, launching it as the Ultra Enterprise 10000 multiprocessor server.  This system was followed by the Sun Fire 15K and Sun Fire 25K. These systems allowed Sun to become a first tier vendor in the large server market. In January 2010, Sun was acquired by Oracle Corporation.

See also 
 Glen Culler
 Cydrome
 Multiflow

References

External links
 1986 news about FPS - Daily Journal of Commerce
 The History of the Development of Parallel Computing
 Howard Thrailkill FPS Computing: A History of Firsts
 Gordon Bell. "A Brief History of Supercomputing"

1970 establishments in Oregon
1991 disestablishments in Oregon
1991 mergers and acquisitions
American companies established in 1970
American companies disestablished in 1991
Beaverton, Oregon
Computer companies established in 1970
Computer companies disestablished in 1991
Defunct companies based in Oregon
Defunct computer companies of the United States
Defunct computer hardware companies
Electronics companies established in 1970
Electronics companies disestablished in 1991
Floating point